Mark Anthony Riley is a British nuclear physicist.

Riley earned his bachelor's degree and doctorate in physics at the University of Liverpool. He completed postdoctoral research at the Niels Bohr Institute, Oak Ridge National Laboratory, and the University of Tennessee and held the SERC Advanced Fellowship at the University of Liverpool before joining the faculty of Florida State University in 1990. In 2000, Riley was elected a fellow of the American Physical Society, [f]or his many pioneering contributions to the exploration of atomic nuclei at high angular momentum values." The following year, Riley was appointed Raymond K. Sheline Professor of Physics in 2001, and from 2014 to 2015, held a Robert O. Lawton Distinguished Professorship. He became interim dean of Florida State University's Graduate School in August 2017, and was formally elevated to the deanship in April 2018.

References

Fellows of the American Physical Society
Year of birth missing (living people)
British university and college faculty deans
British nuclear physicists
Living people
20th-century British physicists
21st-century British physicists
Alumni of the University of Liverpool
Florida State University faculty
British expatriate academics in the United States